Jatrapur Union is a Union Parishad under Bagerhat Sadar Upazila of Bagerhat District in the division of Khulna, Bangladesh. It has an area of 26.00 km2 (10.04 sq mi) and a population of 22,071.

References

Unions of Bagerhat Sadar Upazila
Unions of Bagerhat District
Unions of Khulna Division